Alessandro Borghese (born November 19, 1976) is an Italian restaurateur, author, and television personality. His mother is the German-American actress Barbara Bouchet.

Books
 L'abito non fa il cuoco. La cucina italiana di uno chef gentiluomo (2009)
 Tu come lo fai? (2013)
 Alessandro Borghese Kitchen Sound. Senti come suona questo piatto! (2017)
 Cacio&Pepe. La mia vita in 50 ricette (2018)

Television appearances
 Cortesie per gli ospiti (Real Time, 2005–2012)
 L'ost (Real Time, 2005)
 Cuoco gentiluomo (Real Time, 2006)
 Chef per un giorno (LA7, 2007–2011)
 Chef a domicilio (Real Time, 2009)
 Ci vediamo domenica (Rai 2, 2009)
 Cuochi e fiamme (LA7d, 2010)
 Cortesie per gli ospiti New York (Real Time, 2010)
 Fuori menù (Real Time, 2009–2012)
 Lasciami cantare! (Rai 1, 2011) 
 La notte degli chef (Canale 5, 2011) 
 Cucina con Ale (Real Time, 2011–2012)
 Ale contro tutti (Sky Uno, 2012–2013)
 Junior MasterChef Italia (Sky Uno, 2014–2016)
 4 ristoranti (Sky Uno, 2015–)
 Kitchen sound (Sky Uno, 2015–)
 Cuochi d'Italia (TV8, 2017–)
 Miss Italia (LA7, 2018)
 Kitchen Duel (Sky Uno, 2019–)
 Alessandro Borghese – Celebrity Chef (Sky Uno, 2022–)

References

1976 births
Living people
Italian people of German descent
Participants in Italian reality television series
Mass media people from Rome
Italian restaurateurs
Italian television chefs